Karatamak (Qaratamaq) is a rural locality (a village) in Kushmanakovsky Selsoviet, Burayevsky District, Bashkortostan, Russia. The population was 136 as of 2010.

Geography 
Karatamak is located 14 km west of Burayevo (the district's administrative centre) by road. Abzayevo is the nearest rural locality.

References 

Rural localities in Burayevsky District